Hoplochelys is an extinct genus of kinosternoid.

References

Kinosternidae
Late Cretaceous turtles of North America
Cretaceous reptiles of North America
Hell Creek fauna